Bonequinha de Seda (English: Silk Doll) is a 1936 Brazilian film directed by Oduvaldo Vianna, and starring Gilda de Abreu.

Cast 
Gilda de Abreu ... Marilda
Delorges Caminha ... João Siqueira
Conchita de Moraes ... Madame Valle
Darcy Cazarré ... Pechincha
Mira Magrassi ... Madame Pechincha
Apolo Correia ... Mesquita
Carlos Barbosa ... Dr. Leitão

References

External links
 

1936 films
Brazilian black-and-white films
1930s Portuguese-language films
Brazilian musical comedy films
Brazilian romantic comedy films
1936 romantic comedy films
Cinédia films
1930s romantic musical films
1936 musical comedy films